Cartodere nodifer is a species of minute brown scavenger beetles native to Australia and New Zealand but now cosmopolitan.

References

Latridiidae
Beetles described in 1839
Beetles of Europe